Step Off is an album by rock band ESG, released in 2002.

Legacy

Fifteen years since its release, critics returned to the album. PopMatters John Paul applauded it for staying "as timeless as ever", writing that it "exist[s] in that rarified region of albums refusing to be date-stamped."

Track listing
 all songs written by Renee Scroggins and Valerie Scroggins
"Be Good To Me" - 3:54
"Talk It" - 3:58
"It's Not Me" - 3:55
"Six Pack" - 4:16
"Step Off" - 5:14
"Sensual Intentions" - 5:19
"My Street" - 4:40

Personnel
Renee Scroggins – lead vocals
Valerie Scroggins – drums
Marie Scroggins – congas
Chistelle Polite – guitar
Nicole Nicholas – bass

References

2002 albums
ESG (band) albums
Soul Jazz Records albums